The 1987 Gator Bowl was a college football bowl game between the South Carolina Gamecocks and the LSU Tigers. LSU defeated South Carolina, 30–13.

Background
South Carolina competed as an independent and was tied for fourth-best record among independent schools. LSU finished second in the Southeastern Conference (SEC).
 The game would be vaunted as a matchup between the "Black Death" defense of SC versus the prolific pro-style LSU offense led by Tommy Hodson at QB and Wendell Davis, one of the best wideouts in all of college football.

Game summary

First quarter
LSU – Wendell Davis, 39-yard pass from Tommy Hodson (David Browndyke kick)
LSU – Davis, 12-yard pass from Hodson (Browndyke kick) 
South Carolina – Collin Mackie, 44-yard field goal

Second quarter
LSU – Browndyke, 27-yard field goal 
South Carolina – Mackie, 39-yard field goal
LSU – Browndyke, 18-yard field goal

Third quarter
LSU – Davis, 25-yard pass from Hodson (Browndyke kick)

Fourth quarter
South Carolina – Harold Green, 10-yard run (Mackie kick) 
LSU – Browndyke, 23-yard field goal

Statistics

Aftermath
South Carolina was invited to join the Southeastern Conference in 1990, and began playing football in their new conference in 1992. The Gamecocks and Tigers first met as SEC opponents in 1994 at Baton Rouge. South Carolina won that game 18-17, but is 0-7-1 vs. LSU since.

References

Gator Bowl
Gator Bowl
South Carolina Gamecocks football bowl games
LSU Tigers football bowl games
December 1987 sports events in the United States